Minors Aloud (subtitled Buddy Emmons with Lenny Breau) is an album by American pedal steel guitarist Buddy Emmons and Canadian guitarist Lenny Breau that was released in 1978.

History
Minors Aloud was digitally remastered and reissued on CD by Art of Life in 2005 and includes a 6-page booklet, original and new liner notes and a copy of the lead sheet for the title track handwritten by Breau himself.

In his liner notes for the reissue, Emmons states: "... producer Mike Melford asked me if I would be interested in recording with Lenny Breau. My response was a quick yes but on the condition that Lenny would be the featured artist and I'd be listed as a guest... I learned later that Lenny hadn't been told anything about the project other than to just show up. With a few days preparation and a little polish to the arrangements, this would have been a different album. For better or worse we'll never know, but I do know the solos were spontaneous, the energy level was fantastic, and we all had a great time getting there."

Reception

Writing for Allmusic, music critic Paul Kohler singled out a few of the songs as noteworthy and notes "The pedal steel definitely gives a rather unique sound to Benny Golson's "Killer Joe," though Breau is clearly the more interesting soloist... Flying Fish was always interested in mixing musicians from country and jazz; this somewhat uneven date should be considered at least a partial success."

Track listing
"Minors Aloud" (Buddy Emmons, Lenny Breau) – 3:41
"Compared to What" (Gene McDaniels) –  4:39
"Killer Joe" (Benny Golson) – 6:08
"Long Way to Go" (Michael Melford, Wolf Opper) – 4:27
"Secret Love" (Sammy Fain, Paul Francis Webster) –  5:06
"Scrapple from the Apple" (Charlie Parker) – 7:08
"On a Bach Bouree" (Breau) – 6:27

Personnel
Buddy Emmons – pedal steel guitar
Lenny Breau – guitar
Randy Goodrum – keyboards
Charles Dungey – bass
Kenny Malone – drums

Production notes
Michael Melford – producer
Al Pachucki – engineer
Ben Tallent – engineer
J. D. Sloan – photography
Buddy Emmons – liner notes

References

External links
lennybreau.com discography entry

Lenny Breau albums
1978 albums